Brian or Bryan Brown may refer to:

Sports
 Brian Brown (Australian footballer) (born 1957), Australian rules footballer
 Brian Brown (football coach) (born 1957), Australian association football player and coach
 Brian Brown (Jamaican footballer) (born 1992), Jamaican footballer
 Brian Brown (high jumper) (born 1967), American high jumper, former director of the Drake Relays
 Brian Brown (racing driver) (born 1978), American race car driver

Arts and entertainment
 Brian Brown (musician) (1933–2013), Australian jazz saxophonist
 Bryan Brown (born 1947), Australian actor
 Box Brown (Brian Brown, born 1980), American cartoonist

Military
 Brian Brown (Royal Navy officer) (1934–2020)
 Bryan D. Brown (born 1948), US general
 Brian B. Brown (born 1964), U.S. Navy officer

Other
 Brian Brown (North Carolina politician) (born 1979), American politician
 Brian S. Brown (born ), American activist, president of the National Organization for Marriage
 Brian H. Brown, British medical physicist

See also
 Brian Browne (1937–2018), Canadian jazz pianist and composer